GSCC is an initialism. It may refer to:

 Gardner Steel Conference Center, an academic building of the University of Pittsburgh
 General Social Care Council, a former non-departmental public body of the Department of Health in the United Kingdom
 Golden Strip Career Center, a vocational school in South Carolina
 Green Senatorial Campaign Committee, a committee to support the Green Party of the United States's candidates for Senate

See also
 GCSS (disambiguation)
 GSC (disambiguation)